Tomás Etcheverry (born 14 February 1991) is an Uruguayan rugby union player, currently playing for Súper Liga Americana de Rugby side Peñarol. His preferred position is fullback.

Professional career
Etcheverry signed for Súper Liga Americana de Rugby side Peñarol ahead of the 2021 Súper Liga Americana de Rugby season. He has also represented the Uruguay Sevens team at 4 tournaments between 2018 and 2019.

In 2022, Etcheverry competed for Uruguay at the Rugby World Cup Sevens in Cape Town.

References

External links
itsrugby.co.uk Profile

1991 births
Living people
Uruguayan rugby union players
Rugby union locks
Peñarol Rugby players